E & D Litis Stadium is a stadium in Leederville, Western Australia. Originally constructed in 1959 and officially opened on 14 March 1959 as a velodrome for the 1962 British Empire and Commonwealth Games. The Floreat Athena Football Club moved to the velodrome in 1985 and is the sole lessee of the stadium. The stadium is part of the City of Vincent's Britannia Reserve, which is one of the City's most popular sporting venues.

The stadium is also the venue for the annual Community World Cup, which is organised by the Latin American Association of WA.

Name
The stadium was originally known as the Lake Monger Velodrome and was popularly known as the Velodrome. In 1998 the stadium was renamed the E & D Litis Stadium after Evangelos and Despo Litis donated $150,000 to the Floreat Athena club.

References

Soccer venues in Perth, Western Australia
1962 British Empire and Commonwealth Games venues